This is a list of law enforcement agencies in the state of South Carolina.

According to the US Bureau of Justice Statistics' 2022 'Census of State and Local Law Enforcement Agencies,'' the state had 272 law enforcement agencies employing 11,674 sworn police officers, about 259 for each 100,000 residents.

State agencies 

 South Carolina Department of Corrections (SCDC)
 Office of Inspector General(OIG)
 South Carolina Department of Natural Resources, Law Enforcement Division (SCDNR)
 South Carolina Department of Public Safety (SCDPS)
 South Carolina Highway Patrol (SCHP)
 South Carolina State Transport Police Division (SCSTP)
 South Carolina Bureau of Protective Services (BPS)
 South Carolina Law Enforcement Division (SLED)
 South Carolina State Constable's Office
 South Carolina State Ports Authority Port Police
 South Carolina Department of Probation, Parole, and Pardon Services (SCDPPPS)
 South Carolina Department of Mental Health Public Safety (SCDMHPS)
 South Carolina State Forestry Commission Law Enforcement 
 South Carolina Department of Juvenile Justice

County agencies

City and town agencies

College agencies 

Allen University Police Department
Benedict College Police Department
Bob Jones University Police Department
Clemson University Police Department
Coastal Carolina University Department of Public Safety
Denmark Technical College Department of Public Safety
Erskine College Police Department
Francis Marion University Police Department
Furman University Police Department
Greenville Technical College Police Department
Lander University Police Department
Medical University of South Carolina Department of Public Safety
Midlands Technical College Campus Police
Orangeburg-Calhoun Technical College Police Department
Presbyterian College Campus Police Department
South Carolina State University Police Department
Spartanburg Community College Police Department
Spartanburg Methodist College Campus Safety Department
The Citadel Department of Public Safety
Tri County Technical College Campus Safety
Trident Technical College Department of Public Safety
University of South Carolina-Aiken Police Department
University of South Carolina-Beaufort Department of Public Safety
University of South Carolina Division of Law Enforcement and Safety
University of South Carolina Upstate Department of Public Safety
Winthrop University Police Department
Wofford College Campus Safety

Other agencies

Columbia Metro Housing Authority Police Department
Columbia Metropolitan Airport Police Department
Florence Regional Airport Department of Public Safety
Joint Base Charleston Security Forces
Marine Corps Air Station Beaufort Provost Marshal

References

South Carolina
Law enforcement agencies of South Carolina
Law enforcement agencies